DFCO may refer to:
 Dijon FCO, Dijon Football Côte d'Or
 Deceleration fuel cut-off, see Fuel economy-maximizing behaviors (section: Burn and coast)